Khui Ningomba was a ruler of Ancient Manipur (Antique Kangleipak). He was the successor of Emperor Taothingmang.

It was during his reign that the Manipuri traders reached out on horseback to upper Burma and China. He is one of the nine kings associated with the design of a historic flag. 

Besides the Cheitharol Kumbaba, he is mentioned in the Ningthourol Lambuba.

References 

Kings of Ancient Manipur
Pages with unreviewed translations